Leucopogon dielsianus is a species of flowering plant in the heath family Ericaceae and is endemic to the south-west of Western Australia. It was first formally described in 1904 by Ernst Georg Pritzel in Botanische Jahrbücher für Systematik, Pflanzengeschichte und Pflanzengeographie from specimens collected near Tammin. The specific epithet (dielsianus) honours Ludwig Diels.

Leucopogon dielsianus occurs in the Avon Wheatbelt, Coolgardie, Esperance Plains, Jarrah Forest and Mallee bioregions of south-western Western Australia and is listed under the name Styphelia dielsiana as "not threatened", by the Government of Western Australia Department of Biodiversity, Conservation and Attractions.

References

dielsianus
Ericales of Australia
Flora of Western Australia
Plants described in 1904
Taxa named by Ernst Pritzel